The Atlantic Biogeographic Region is the biogeographic region of Europe bordering the Atlantic Ocean and North Sea.

Extent

The Atlantic Region borders on the North Sea and North-east Atlantic Ocean.
It includes all of the United Kingdom, Ireland and the Netherlands, parts of Germany, Denmark, Belgium and France, and the northern shores of Spain and Portugal.
As a result, it has an oceanic climate with mild winters and cool summers.
There is moderate rainfall year-round.

Environment

The long, indented coastline includes many habitats.
Some areas have cliffs and rocky headlands with narrow tidal inlets, while others have sheltered bays with inter-tidal mudflats and sandy beaches.
The land was ice-covered until 10,000 years ago, and species diversity is still lower than other European biogeographic regions, but wildlife is abundant, including large flocks of migratory birds and many marine organisms fed by nutrients carried by the Gulf Stream from the Caribbean.
The land has been drastically modified by humans with forests cleared to make way for farming and large urbanized areas.
Pollution is a problem on both land and sea, and over-fishing is also a threat.

Notes

Sources

Environment of Europe
Biogeography